A statue of Juan José Arreola is installed along the Rotonda de los Jaliscienses Ilustres, in Centro, Guadalajara, in the Mexican state of Jalisco. The statue was installed on 20 September 2015 and it was inaugurated the next day, the 97th anniversary of his birth. His rests remain there. It is a bronze statue that weights  and features Arreola with his hand slightly raised. It was created by Rubén Orozco, aided by Claudia and Orso Arreola, Juan José's offsprings.

References

External links
 

2015 establishments in Mexico
2015 sculptures
Bronze sculptures in Mexico
Outdoor sculptures in Guadalajara
Rotonda de los Jaliscienses Ilustres
Sculptures of men in Mexico
Statues in Jalisco